The 1910 Vanderbilt Commodores baseball team represented the Vanderbilt Commodores of the Vanderbilt University in the 1910 IAAUS baseball season, winning the SIAA championship. A game with St. Mary on April 27 was cancelled due to bad weather, as was a game with the Alumni on May 7, a second game with Michigan and one game with Sewanee.

Roster

Schedule and results

References

Vanderbilt Commodores
Vanderbilt Commodores baseball seasons
Southern Intercollegiate Athletic Association baseball champion seasons
1910 in sports in Tennessee